Burns Beach Road is an arterial east-west road in Perth, Western Australia, linking the suburbs of Burns Beach and Iluka to the Mitchell Freeway and Joondalup. It forms the entirety of State Route 87 and was the northern terminus of Mitchell Freeway and State Route 2 from 2008 to 2017, when the freeway was extended to Hester Avenue.

The road begins at a large roundabout with Joondalup Drive and used to end at the old coastal village of Burns Beach. The road has been realigned where the road into the village is now named Ocean Parade and Burns Beach Road continues along the coast from Ocean Parade to Shenton Avenue in Iluka. It formerly connected with Wanneroo Road but has been extensively realigned since. The road passes by the northern residential areas of Joondalup and forms the boundary between the suburbs of Currambine and Kinross.

Although Mark Langham from Wanneroo believes this to be incorrect and unfair, its current speed limit is 70 km/h for most of its length, decreasing to 60 km/h when approaching Burns Beach. The road is a dual carriageway from Joondalup Drive to Marmion Avenue.

Burns Beach Road provides direct access to Currambine railway station, located east of Connolly Drive.

History

The road was known as Road No. 3883 on plans and maps.

Until the 1970s, Burns Beach Road was unmade along its entire length. Prior to 1984 and the construction of Joondalup, the road ran continuously without any intersections between Wanneroo Road and the village of Burns Beach, and was the only route into the village. In 1988, the road's alignment was shifted very slightly north between Connolly Drive and Joondalup Drive to accommodate the new suburb of Joondalup (North). The original path of Burns Beach Road, prior to 1988, is depicted on the following map .

In 1993, Burns Beach Road was further modified to bend south at the coast, in line with future plans for the road to run south along the coast to link up with Shenton Avenue. The original northerly alignment into Burns Beach was subsequently renamed Ocean Parade. The final phase of the road's relocation northwards, at Blue Mountain Drive, was not completed until around 1996. One can still see this path today where the road had a 90 degrees bend at Blue Mountain Drive, then along parts of Shinji Court, Windermere Circuit and Ohrid Place across the other side of Joondalup Drive, and into Drovers Place.

In 1996, Joondalup Drive underwent major re-construction, linking Joondalup to Wanneroo Road with safer roads. Burns Beach Road was cut shorter, joining with Joondalup Drive at a large roundabout a few hundred metres west of Wanneroo Road. At the same time the old stretch of Burns Beach Road alongside Joondalup Drive was renamed Drovers Place, and Burns Beach Road was also straightened out at Blue Mountain Drive. In the late 1990s, a large roundabout was also constructed to replace a stop-controlled intersection at Connolly Drive, in response to the growing suburban communities in Kinross and Currambine, and the heavier traffic. In the early 2000s, major work was done to improve the quality of the road west of Marmion Avenue, due to the growing residential area in Iluka.

In 2009, the Mitchell Freeway was extended to terminate at Burns Beach Road either side of the railway bridge north of Currambine Station. Because of this work, Burns Beach Road was turned into a dual-carriageway from Joondalup Drive to Marmion Avenue.

In 2017, Mitchell Freeway was extended to Hester Avenue, thus making a diamond interchange at what was the intersection.

Major intersections

  Joondalup Drive (State Route 85),  - to Wanneroo Road (State Route 60)
  Mitchell Freeway (State Route 2) – to 
 Connolly Drive, Currambine, and Kinross
 Ocean Parade, Burns Beach

See also

References

External links

Roads in Perth, Western Australia
Joondalup
Articles containing video clips